The Shire of Bundanba is a former local government area in the south-east of Queensland, Australia. It existed from 1879 to 1916.

The spelling of Bundanba was officially changed to Bundamba in 1932, but the Bundamba spelling was in common use long prior to that.

History
On 11 November 1879, the Bundanba Division was created as one of 74 divisions within Queensland under the Divisional Boards Act 1879 with a population of 1828.

With the passage of the Local Authorities Act 1902, the Bundanba Division became the Shire of Bundanba on 31 March 1903.

The Greater Ipswich Scheme
On 13 October 1916, a rationalisation of the local government areas in and around Ipswich was implemented. It involved the abolition of five shires:
 Brassall
 Bundanba
 Lowood
 Purga
 Walloon
resulting in:
 an enlarged City of Ipswich by including part of the Shire of Brassall and part of the Shire of Bundanba
 a new Shire of Ipswich by amalgamating part of the Shire of Brassall, part of the Shire of Bundanba, part of the Shire of Walloon and all of the Shire of Purga
 an enlarged Shire of Esk by including all of the Shire of Lowood
 an enlarged Shire of Rosewood by including part of the Shire of Walloon

Chairmen

The following served as chairmen:
 1894: William Jones 
 1896–97: William Staff
 1899: Harry Ferrett
 1900: Harry Ferrett
 1903–06: Harry Ferrett
 1912: Harry Ferrett
 1916: Edward John L. Easton

Other notable councillors
 John Ferrett, Member of the Queensland Legislative Assembly

References

Former local government areas of Queensland
1879 establishments in Australia
1916 disestablishments in Australia